The Golden State Warriors are an American professional basketball team based in San Francisco. The franchise has also been based in Philadelphia, Oakland, and San Jose (during a renovation of its home arena). The team is a member of the Pacific Division of the Western Conference in the National Basketball Association (NBA). The Warriors joined the Basketball Association of America (BAA) as the Philadelphia Warriors in 1946 and won the first BAA championship title in the same year, under coach Edward Gottlieb. The Warriors joined the NBA at its foundation in 1949. The Warriors' record was 26–42 in their first NBA season, and they lost in the first round of the playoffs to the Syracuse Nationals. Franklin Mieuli and the Diners Club put together a group of 40 local investors to move the Warriors to San Francisco before the 1962–63 NBA season, with Mieuli eventually buying all the shares of the franchise to keep the team from collapsing and to keep it in the area. After playing several home games in Oakland from 1967 onward, the team moved to Oakland full-time for the 1971–72 NBA season and changed its name to the Golden State Warriors.

Led by Rick Barry, the Warriors were a formidable franchise during the middle 1970s, achieving winning records every season from 1971–72 to 1977–78, winning two division titles, and defeating the Washington Bullets in the 1975 NBA championship. However, after Barry departed at the end of the 1977–78 season, the Warriors were out of the hunt for a title for the next 35 seasons. Between 1978–79 and 2011–12, the Warriors only achieved winning records in eight seasons. The team also suffered the NBA’s fourth-longest postseason appearance drought in history, with no playoff appearances between 1994–95 and 2005–06; this mark trails only the Braves/Clippers between 1976–77 and 1990–91, the Timberwolves between 2004–05 and 2016–17, and the Kings from 2006–07 to 2018–19 (still active)

Led by NBA Most Valuable Player Stephen Curry, the Warriors defeated the Cleveland Cavaliers in six games to win the 2015 NBA championship series. In the following season, the Warriors—boosted by over half a decade of skillful drafting—finished with the best record in NBA history; the team ended the 2015–16 season with a mark of 73–9, one win better than Michael Jordan’s 1995–96 Bulls. The Warriors reached the 2016 NBA Finals but were defeated by the Cavaliers in seven games. After adding Kevin Durant in the off-season, they won 67 games during the 2016–17 campaign. The Warriors set another NBA record by winning 207 games during the three-year period ending in 2017. In the 2017 NBA Finals, the Warriors faced the Cavaliers again and won the NBA title in five games. In 2018, meeting the Cavaliers in the finals for the fourth consecutive season, the Warriors swept the series, winning the final game 108–85. In 2019, the Warriors returned to the NBA Finals for the fifth consecutive time, however, the Cavaliers did not appear in this series. They became the second team in NBA history to reach the NBA Finals in five consecutive seasons. The Warriors faced off against the Toronto Raptors and they lost to them in six games.

Upon injuries to backcourt duo Stephen Curry and Klay Thompson as well as Durant's sign-and-trade departure to the Brooklyn Nets, the Warriors struggled for the next two years, failing to qualify for the playoffs in either season. The team would return to familiar success after defeating the Boston Celtics in 6 games in the 2022 NBA Finals. Curry would win NBA Finals MVP, winning his fourth championship and cementing his role as the face of the franchise's dynastic era. The following 2022 season would see difficulties in balancing veteran leadership and youthful development, producing criticisms from analysts and opponents in the Warrior's ability to continue their dominance.

Table key

Seasons
Note: Statistics are correct as of the 2020–21 NBA season.

All-time records

References

General

Specific

 
seasons